Raymond Andrew Winstone (born 19 February 1957) is an English television, stage and film actor with a career spanning five decades. Having worked with many prominent directors, including Martin Scorsese and Steven Spielberg, Winstone is perhaps best known for his "hard man" roles (usually delivered in his distinctive London accent). The first of these was the character Carlin in Scum, the 1979 film remake of a BBC television play in a role that Winstone had originated, but was not broadcast due to its violent nature. The same year he played ex-army soldier Kevin in the cult classic Quadrophenia. In the 1980s he rose to prominence starring as Will Scarlet in the successful television series Robin of Sherwood. 

Winstone has been described as one of the UK's "seminal screen hard nuts", while The Guardian has said that he "plays troubled hard men with such conviction, it's easy to believe he's not acting", adding that he is "the East End's answer to George Clooney". He has appeared in a wide variety of feature films, including Nil by Mouth (1997), Sexy Beast (2000), Ripley's Game (2002), The Magic Roundabout (2005), The Departed (2006), Beowulf (2007), Indiana Jones and the Kingdom of the Crystal Skull (2008), 44 Inch Chest (2009), London Boulevard (2010), Hugo (2011), Snow White and the Huntsman (2012), Point Break (2015), King of Thieves (2018), Cats (2019) and Black Widow (2021).

Early life 
Winstone was born on 19 February 1957 in Hackney Hospital, London. He first lived in Caister Park Road, Plaistow E13, and attended Portway infants and junior school. He moved to Enfield when he was seven and grew up on a council estate just off the A10 road. His father, Raymond J. Winstone (1933–2015), ran a fruit and vegetable business while his mother, Margaret (née Richardson; 1932–1985) had a job emptying fruit machines. Winstone has recounted how, as a child, he used to play with his friends on bomb sites (vacant lots with rubble from World War II bombs). He joined Brimsdown Primary School and later he was educated at Edmonton County School which had changed from a grammar school to a comprehensive upon his arrival. He also attended Corona Theatre School. He did not take to school, eventually leaving with a single CSE (Grade 2) in Drama. He recounted an early encounter with a notorious gangster:

Winstone had an early affinity for acting; his father would take him to the cinema every Wednesday afternoon. Later, he viewed Albert Finney in Saturday Night and Sunday Morning, and said: "I thought, 'I could be that geezer'." Other major influences included John Wayne, James Cagney, and Edward G. Robinson. After borrowing extra tuition money from a friend's mother, a drama teacher, Winstone took to the stage, appearing as a Cockney newspaper seller in a production of Emil and the Detectives.

Winstone was also a fan of boxing. Known to his friends as Winnie, he was called Little Sugs at home (his father already being known as Sugar, after Sugar Ray Robinson). At the age of 12, Winstone joined the Repton Amateur Boxing Club. Over the next 10 years, he won 80 out of 88 bouts. At welterweight, he was London schoolboy champion on three occasions, fighting twice for England. The experience gave him a perspective on his later career: "If you can get in a ring with 2,000 people watching and be smacked around by another guy, then walking onstage isn't hard."

School
Deciding to pursue drama, Winstone enrolled at the Corona Stage Academy in Hammersmith, when he was aged "about seventeen". At £900 a term, it was expensive considering the average wage was then about £36 a week. He landed his first major role in What a Crazy World at the Theatre Royal, Stratford in London, but he danced and sang badly, leading his usually supportive father to say "Give it up, while you're ahead." One of his first TV appearances came in the 1976 "Loving Arms" episode of the popular police series The Sweeney where he was credited as "Raymond Winstone" (as he was in "What a Crazy World") and played a minor part as an unnamed young thug.

Winstone was not popular with the establishment at his secondary school, who considered him a bad influence. When he discovered that he was the only pupil not invited to the Christmas party he decided to take revenge for this slight. Hammering some pins through a piece of wood, he placed it under the wheel of his headmistress's car and blew out the tyre, for which he was expelled. As a joke, he went up to the BBC, where his schoolmates were involved in an audition and got one of his own by flirting with the secretary. The audition was for one of the most notorious plays in history – Alan Clarke's Scum – and, because Clarke liked Winstone's cocky, aggressive boxer's walk, he got the part, even though it had been written for a Glaswegian.

The play, written by Roy Minton and directed by Clarke, was a brutal depiction of a young offender's institution. Winstone was cast in the leading role of Carlin, a young offender who struggles against both his captors and his fellow cons to become the "Daddy" of the institution. Hard hitting and often violent (particularly during the infamous "billiards" scene in which Carlin uses two billiard balls stuffed in a sock to beat one of his fellow inmates over the head) the play was judged unsuitable for broadcast by the BBC, and was not shown until 1991. The banned television play was entirely re-filmed in 1979 for cinematic release with many of the original actors playing the same roles, including Winstone. In a commentary for the Scum DVD, Winstone cites Clarke as a major influence on his career and laments the director's death in 1990 from cancer.

While Winstone has portrayed many characters who share the "hard man" nature of his performance in Scum, he has also explored a variety of other roles, including comedy (Martha, Meet Frank, Daniel and Laurence) and as the romantic lead (Fanny and Elvis). His favourite role was Henry VIII in the 2003 TV serial of the same name, remarking at the time: "It's really flattering for me to be asked to play a king. I mean, I'm a kid out of Plaistow, and I'm playing one of the most famous kings of England. It's fantastic!"

Career

Film

1970s and 1980s 
After a short run in the TV series Fox (1980), and a role in Ladies and Gentlemen, The Fabulous Stains (1982), alongside Diane Lane, Laura Dern, and a host of real life punks like Fee Waybill, Steve Jones, Paul Cook, and Paul Simonon, Winstone starred in the opening episode of the third season of Bergerac (1983), quickly followed by another big break, when he was cast as Will Scarlet in Robin of Sherwood (which began in 1984). He proved immensely popular and enjoyed the role, considering Scarlet to be "the first football hooligan" – although he was reportedly not fond of the dubbed German version. When the series ended, he again teamed up with Jason Connery when they co-starred in Tank Malling, which also featured Amanda Donohoe and Maria Whittaker. Over the years, he has appeared in TV shows including The Sweeney, The Bill, Boon, Fairly Secret Army (as Stubby Collins), Ever Decreasing Circles, One Foot in the Grave, ‘’Home To Roost, (Se4, Ep6)’’, Murder Most Horrid, Birds of a Feather, Minder, Kavanagh QC, Auf Wiedersehen, Pet, and Get Back (with the fledgling Kate Winslet). During this period, he was increasingly drawn to the theatre, playing in Hinkemann in 1988, Some Voices in 1994 and Dealer's Choice and Pale Horse the following year. Ray also added his London accent to a dance track in 1982 by "Marsha Raven" called "I Like Plastic".

1990s 
Winstone was asked to appear in Mr Thomas, a play written by his friend and fellow Londoner Kathy Burke. The reviews were good, and led to Winstone being cast, alongside Burke in Gary Oldman's drama Nil By Mouth. He was widely lauded for his performance as an alcoholic wife-batterer, receiving a BAFTA nomination (17 years after his Best Newcomer award for That Summer). He continued to play "tough guy" roles in Face and The War Zone – the latter especially controversial, as he played a man who rapes his own daughter – but that obvious toughness would also allow him to play loved-up nice-guys in romantic comedies Fanny and Elvis and There's Only One Jimmy Grimble. In Last Christmas, he played a dead man, now a trainee angel, who returns from heaven to help his young son cope with his bereavement which was written by Tony Grounds. In 1995, he played the sinister and mysterious Thane in the comedy drama series The Ghostbusters of East Finchley. The series was also written by Grounds, with whom Winstone worked again on Births, Marriages & Deaths and Our Boy, the latter winning him the Royal Television Society Best Actor Award. They worked together again in 2006 on All in the Game where Winstone portrayed a football manager. He did a series of Holsten Pils advertisements where he played upon the phrase "Who's the Daddy", coined in the film Scum.

2000s 
In 2000, Winstone starred alongside Jude Law in Love, Honour and Obey. He then won the lead role in Sexy Beast, which earned him great acclaim from UK and international audiences and brought him to the attention of the American film industry. Winstone plays "Gal" Dove, a retired and happily married former thief dragged back into London's underworld by a psychopathic former associate (Ben Kingsley, who received an Oscar nomination for his performance). In 2000, he starred in To the Green Fields Beyond at the Donmar Warehouse and directed by Sam Mendes. In 2002, he performed at the Royal Court as Griffin in The Night Heron. Two years later, he joined Kevin Spacey for 24 Hour Plays at the Old Vic, a series of productions that were written, rehearsed and performed in a single day.

After a brief role alongside Burke again in the tragi-comic The Martins, he appeared in Last Orders where he starred alongside Michael Caine, Helen Mirren, David Hemmings, and Tom Courtenay. Next Winstone would get a prime part in Ripley's Game, the semi-sequel to The Talented Mr. Ripley, in which he once again played a gangster. He followed up with Lenny Blue, the sequel to Tough Love, and the short The Bouncer. Now internationally known, Winstone was next chosen by Anthony Minghella to play Teague, a sinister Home Guard boss in the American Civil War drama Cold Mountain.

At this time, Winstone set up Size 9 and Flicks production companies with his longtime agent Michael Wiggs. The first effort was She's Gone in which he plays a businessman whose young daughter disappears in Istanbul (filming was held up by unrest in the Middle East). He followed it up with Jerusalem in which he played poet and visionary William Blake. 

Winstone made his action film debut in King Arthur, starring Clive Owen, directed by Antoine Fuqua, and produced by Jerry Bruckheimer. Fuqua lauded his performance proclaiming he was "the British De Niro". Winstone provided the voice of Soldier Sam in the screen version of The Magic Roundabout.

In 2005, he appeared opposite Suranne Jones in ITV drama Vincent about a team of private detectives. He returned to the role in 2006 and was awarded an International Emmy. He also portrayed a 19th-century English policeman trying to tame the Australian outback in The Proposition. In 2006, American critic Roger Ebert described Winstone as "one of the best actors now at work in movies".

A complete change of pace for Winstone was when he provided the voice for the cheeky-chappy Mr. Beaver in The Chronicles of Narnia: The Lion, the Witch and the Wardrobe, also in 2005. Winstone appeared in Martin Scorsese's 2006 film The Departed as Mr. French, an enforcer to Jack Nicholson's Irish mob boss. Critic Roger Ebert singled out Winstone for praise among the ensemble cast of The Departed, writing that the actor "invests every line with the authority of God dictating to Moses".

He provided motion capture movements and voice-over work for the title character in the Robert Zemeckis' film Beowulf. He then co-starred in Indiana Jones and the Kingdom of the Crystal Skull, which was released on 22 May 2008. He returned to television drama in The Changeling-inspired Compulsion, originally shown in May 2009.

2010 to present 

Winstone has mixed work in Hollywood productions with work in lower budget, independent films. In 2010, Winstone starred as Arjan van Diemen in the film Tracker with Temuera Morrison He had a role as CIA agent Darius Jedburgh in the Edge of Darkness remake, replacing Robert De Niro. In 2011, Winston starred British independent film The Hot Potato. In 2012, Winstone starred in big screen remake of popular 70s show  The Sweeney (having had a minor role in the original series). In 2015, Winstone starred in  The Gunman with Sean Penn, the film was a box office failure. In 2015 Winstone also featured in remake  Point Break, a relative box office success, though critically panned. 

2017 saw the actor star in critically acclaimed British independent film Jawbone, before 2018's critical and box office failure  King of Thieves. 2019 would see Winstone star in critical disaster The Queen's Corgi, and critical and box office bomb  Cats. After a 2020 in which no productions featuring Winstone were released, in 2021 Winstone starred in Marvel's  Black Widow.

Television

In April 2013, while a guest host of the comedy quiz show Have I Got News for You, he provoked controversy by stating that Scotland's chief exports were "oil, whisky, tartan and tramps", leading to a headline in The Scotsman claiming "Ray Winstone calls Scots 'tramps' on TV quiz show". Viewers complained to Ofcom and the BBC. In 2015, he played the role of ex-criminal Jimmy Rose in The Trials of Jimmy Rose, a three-part drama for ITV.

Other work

Since 2009, Winstone has fronted the advertising for betting firm Bet365.

Personal life 
Winstone met his wife, Elaine McCausland, while filming That Summer in 1979. They have three daughters; the eldest two, Lois and Jaime, are actresses. Winstone lives with his wife in Roydon, Essex. He is an avid fan of West Ham United and promoted their 2009 home kit. Winstone was declared bankrupt on 4 October 1988 and again on 19 March 1993. In March 2019, Winstone expressed a preference for leaving the European Union without a deal, in the context of Brexit and argued against holding a second referendum, stating that it would lead to "rebellion" and that "The country voted to leave. Then that's democracy, you leave".

Filmography

Film

Television

Video games

References

External links 

 
 Three-page biography from Tiscali Film & TV
 BBC Drama Faces – Ray Winstone
 Edmonton County former pupils
 
 

1957 births
British male film actors
British male television actors
British male video game actors
British male voice actors
English male film actors
Living people
People from Hackney Central
20th-century British male actors
21st-century British male actors
People from Enfield, London
Male actors from London
Male motion capture actors
International Emmy Award for Best Actor winners
People from Roydon, Essex
People educated at Edmonton County School